A list of windmills in Ille-et-Vilaine, France.

External links
French windmills website

Windmills in France
Ille-et-Vilaine
Buildings and structures in Ille-et-Vilaine